La Torbiera is a park and consists of an area open to the public and a protected area for wildlife preservation. It was established in Agrate Conturbia, Piedmont, Italy in 1977 to preserve and study some animal species in danger of extinction.

Environment
La Torbiera is located in a border area between the Po Valley and the Prealps, characterized by a mild but damp climate, and plenty of small lakes. This is therefore a very favorable environment for the development of mires, which are born progressively by the accumulation of dead parts of vegetable on bottom of lakes. In wet soil, the oxygen deficiency prevents the oxidation processes and the complete decomposition of plants.

The vegetable remains are transformed therefore only partially, becoming peat, and they collect on the bottom, making progressively decrease the depth of the basin. In this way, the plants of the shore which can be pushed towards the inside, reducing, until its demise, the surface of the water. The park, covering an area of 40 acres, provides shelter for many animal species. There are about 400 specimens relative to 130 wildlife species, mostly from the Palaearctic region.

Gallery

References 

Zoos in Italy
Tourist attractions in Piedmont
Parks in Piedmont
Buildings and structures in Piedmont
Zoos established in 1977
1977 establishments in Italy